Jeffrey Bruce "Jeff" Kinney (born November 1, 1949) is a former American football player.  He played  professional as a running back for the Kansas City Chiefs and Buffalo Bills for five seasons in the National Football League (NFL). At 6'2" and 215 lb., Kinney was selected by the Chiefs in the first round of the 1972 NFL Draft with the 23rd overall pick. He is an alumnus of the University of Nebraska–Lincoln.

Early years
Born in Oxford, Nebraska, and raised in McCook, Kinney graduated from McCook High School in 1968 and played quarterback.

Nebraska Cornhuskers
He played college football at Nebraska under head coach Bob Devaney, with future head coach Tom Osborne as offensive coordinator. A three-year starter (1969–71), Kinney was the tailback (I-back) on the national championship teams of 1970 and 1971, and the Huskers' leading rusher in 1969 and 1971. He wore #35, often in a tatters, as tear-away jerseys were common for collegiate offensive backs in the early 1970s.

In the "Game of the Century" against the unbeaten Oklahoma Sooners in Norman on Thanksgiving Day 1971, Kinney rushed for 171 yards, 151 in the second half, on 31 carries (5.5 avg.) and scored four touchdowns, the final one with less than two minutes remaining to put Nebraska ahead 35–31, the final score.

The Huskers went 13–0 in 1971 and were consensus national champions; they defeated the next three teams in the final AP poll: Oklahoma, Colorado (31–7 in Lincoln), and Alabama (38–6 in the Orange Bowl). The 1971 Nebraska Cornhuskers are considered among the most dominant teams in college football history. Kinney finished the 1971 season with 1155 yards rushing on 242 carries (4.8 avg.) and 17 touchdowns.

NFL
Kinney was the second of three Nebraska Cornhuskers selected in the first round of the 1972 NFL draft; QB Jerry Tagge was taken 11th by his hometown team, the Green Bay Packers, and DT Larry Jacobson was selected by the New York Giants with the 24th overall pick, immediately after.

At the start of his fifth season in the NFL in 1976, he was released by the Chiefs after the first game and picked up by the Buffalo Bills in mid-September. Kinney was picked up to replace the injured Jim Braxton as the blocking back for O. J. Simpson. A few weeks after being waived, Kinney gained 114 yards against the Chiefs.

Kinney was waived by the Bills in August 1977, and retired. After football, he worked in financial services.

References

External links
University of Nebraska Athletics – Jeff Kinney
 

1949 births
Living people
American football running backs
Buffalo Bills players
Kansas City Chiefs players
Nebraska Cornhuskers football players
People from McCook, Nebraska
People from Oxford, Nebraska
Players of American football from Nebraska